The swimming competition at the 1961 Summer Universiade took place in Sofia, Bulgaria.

Men’s events

Women’s events

Medal table

References
Medalist Summary (Men) on GBRATHLETICS.com
Medalist Summary (Women) on GBRATHLETICS.com

Swimming at the Summer Universiade
Uni
1961 Summer Universiade